Trinity College is a Chilean high school located in the Machalí-Rancagua conurbation, Cachapoal Province, Chile.

External links 

 School website

References 

Educational institutions with year of establishment missing
Secondary schools in Chile
Schools in Cachapoal Province